Verree Teasdale (March 15, 1903 – February 17, 1987) was an American actress born in Spokane, Washington.

Early years 
 
A second cousin of Edith Wharton, Teasdale attended Erasmus Hall High School in Brooklyn and trained as a stage actress at the New York School of Expression.

Career 

Teasdale debuted on Broadway in the role of Augusta Winslow Martin in The Youngest (1924) and performed there regularly until 1932. After co-starring in Somerset Maugham's play The Constant Wife with Ethel Barrymore in 1926–1927, she was offered a film contract, and her first film, Syncopation, was released in 1929. Teasdale appeared older than her physical age, which enabled her to play bored society wives, scheming other women and second leads in comedies such as Roman Scandals (1933). In 1935, she played Hippolyta in A Midsummer Night's Dream.

Personal life and death 
Teasdale married actor William O'Neal in 1927, and they divorced in 1933. In 1935, she married actor Adolphe Menjou, and they remained together until his death in 1963. Teasdale and Menjou appeared together in two films, The Milky Way in 1936 and Turnabout in 1940, and were co-hosts of a syndicated radio program in the late 1940s and early 1950s. A June 19, 1949, review by Jack Gould in The New York Times said Meet the Menjous "easily is among the most literate and enjoyable items on the daytime schedule".

Teasdale retired after the radio program finished its run, keeping busy with her hobby of costume design. She died on February 17, 1987, in Culver City, California.

Broadway theater

The Youngest, from December 22, 1924, to March 23, 1925 - Augusta Winslow Martin
The Morning After, from July 27, 1925, to August 1925 - Mrs. Madera
The Master of the Inn, from December 21, 1925, to January 1926 - Harriet Norton
Buy, Buy, Baby, from October 07, 1926, to October 1926 - Pauline Lunt
The Constant Wife, from November 29, 1926, to August 13, 1927 - Marie-Louise Durham
By Request, from September 27, 1928, to October 1928 - Claudia Wynn
Precious, from January 14, 1929, to February 1929 - Sonia
Nice Women, from June 10, 1929, to August 1929 - Dorothy Drew
Soldiers and Women, from September 02, 1929, to October 1929 - Helen Arnold
The Royal Virgin, from March 17, 1930, to March 1930 - The Countess of Nottingham
The Greeks Had a Word for It, from September 25, 1930, to May 1931 - Jean
Marriage for Three, from November 11, 1931, to November 1931 - Peggy Howard
Experience Unnecessary, from December 30, 1931, to February 1932 - Theda Thompson

Complete filmography

Syncopation (1929) - Rita Eliot
Her New Chauffeur (1929, Short)
Hunt the Tiger (1929, Short)
The Ninety-Ninth Amendment (1929, Short)
The Sap from Syracuse (1930) - Dolly Clark
Mr. Intruder (1930, Short) - The Wife
Skyscraper Souls (1932) - Sarah Dennis
Payment Deferred (1932) - Mme. Collins
They Just Had to Get Married (1932) - Lola Montrose
Luxury Liner (1933) - Luise Marheim
Terror Aboard (1933) - Millicent Hazlitt
Love, Honor, and Oh Baby! (1933) - Elsie Carpenter
Goodbye Love (1933) - Phyllis Van Kamp aka Fanny Malone
Roman Scandals (1933) - Empress Agrippa
Fashions of 1934 (1934) - Mabel McGuire aka The Duchess
A Modern Hero (1934) - Lady Claire Benston
Madame DuBarry (1934) - Duchess de Granmont
Dr. Monica (1934) - Anna
Desirable (1934) - Helen
The Firebird (1934) - Carola Pointer
A Midsummer Night's Dream (1935) - Hippolyta, Queen of the Amazons, Betrothed to Theseus
The Milky Way (1936) - Ann Westley
First Lady (1937) - Irene Hibbard
Topper Takes a Trip (1938) - Mrs. Parkhurst
5th Ave Girl (1939) - Martha Borden
I Take This Woman (1940) - Madame Marcesca
Turnabout (1940) - Laura Bannister
Love Thy Neighbor (1940) - Barbara Allen
Come Live with Me (1941) - Diana Kendrick (final film role)

References

External links

1903 births
1987 deaths
American film actresses
Burials at Hollywood Forever Cemetery
Actresses from Spokane, Washington
American stage actresses
American radio actresses
20th-century American actresses